The Journal of Chemical Thermodynamics is a monthly peer-reviewed scientific journal covering experimental thermodynamics and thermophysics including bio-thermodynamics, calorimetry, phase equilibria, equilibrium thermodynamic properties and transport properties. It is published by Elsevier. The editors-in-chief are W.E. Acree Jr., N. Kishore, B. F. Woodfield.

Abstracting and indexing 
The journal is abstracted and indexed in Chemical Abstracts, Chemistry Citation Index, Current Contents/Physics, Chemical, & Earth Sciences, Engineered Materials Abstracts, Physics Abstracts, Reaction Citation Index, Science Citation Index, and Scopus.

External links 
 

Monthly journals
Elsevier academic journals
Publications established in 1969
English-language journals
Chemistry journals